Dennis Francis O'Sullivan (5 January 1946 – 16 May 2018) was an Australian rules footballer who played with Carlton in the Victorian Football League (VFL).

Notes

External links 

Denis O'Sullivan's profile at Blueseum

1946 births
Carlton Football Club players
Australian rules footballers from Victoria (Australia)
2018 deaths